Grundhof is a village in the commune of Berdorf, in eastern Luxembourg.  , the village had a population of 26.  Nearby is the confluence of the Sauer and the Black Ernz.

Villages in Luxembourg
Echternach (canton)